David Schütz (August 5, 1941 – July 16, 2017) was an Israeli fiction writer.

Biography
David Schütz (birth name Dietmar Engbert Müllner) was born in Berlin and immigrated to Israel at the age of seven.

He had a master's degree in History from The Hebrew University and also studied cinema at the BFI.

Schütz published 9 books. His first book "The Grass and the Sand" was published in 1978. The book was translated into French (L'herbe et le sable : roman) and German (Gras und Sand : roman). He received a number of literary prizes, including the Bernstein Prize (original Hebrew novel category) in 1988. His experiences as a child and adolescent were central to his writing. His characters struggle with the aftermath of catastrophe of the Holocaust, suffering its consequences in their day-to-day existence, often from the standpoint of a child.

He died on 16 July 2017 after a long illness and was survived by 3 daughters.

Published books
 L'herbe et le sable, novel; translated from Hebrew by  Liliane Servier (Paris: Hachette, 1981) 
 Gras und Sand, novel translated from Hebrew byJudith Brüll-Assan and Ruth Achlama (Hildesheim: Claassen, 1992) 
 Das goldene Tagebuch, translated from Hebrew by  Mirjam Pressler (Frankfurt/Main: Ali-Baba-Verlag, 1993)
 Trilogie des Abschieds, novel, from Hebrew by  Barbara Linner (Hildesheim: Classen, 1993) 
 Avischag, novel, from Hebrew by Mirjam Pressler (Hildesheim: Claassen, 1996) 
 Das Herz der Wassermelone, German/Israeli edition, translated from Hebrew by Pavel C. Goldenberg. With an afterword by Wolf Biermann (Hildesheim: Claassen, 1995).

 העשב והחול, תל-אביב : ספרית פועלים, תשל"ח 1978.
 ההזדמנות האחרונה, תל אביב : ספרית פועלים, תש"מ 1980.
 עד עולם אחכה, תל אביב : זמורה-ביתן, תשמ"ז 1987.
 שושן לבן, שושן אדום, תל-אביב : הקיבוץ המאוחד, 1988.
 אבישג, תל-אביב : עם עובד, תש"ן 1989.
 אבישג, ירושלים : כתר, 1990.
 יומן הזהב, ירושלים : דומינו, 1991.
 העשב והחול, ירושלים : כתר, 1992.
 שבע נשים, ירושלים : כתר, 1995.
 כמו נחל, תל אביב : ידיעות אחרונות : ספרי חמד, 1997.

References

Hocherman, Riva,1991. "David Schutz" in: Hebrew Writers - A General Directory, Israel: The Institute for the Translation of Hebrew Literature.

External links
David Schütz in the Institute for the Translation of Hebrew Literature 

Hebrew University of Jerusalem alumni
20th-century German Jews
German emigrants to Israel
Jewish novelists
People from Jerusalem
Israeli novelists
Bernstein Prize recipients
1941 births
2017 deaths